The following lists events that happened during 2008 in Cape Verde.

Incumbents
President: Pedro Pires
Prime Minister: José Maria Neves

Events
January 9: food export ban from Santo Antão due to the agricultural pest, the Cape Verdean millipede (Spinotarsus caboverdus), lifted
May 18: Local elections took place in the municipalities
June 27: A new government under Prime Minister Neves was announced
October 9: ISE, ISCEMAR and INAG were dissolved, having become part of the University of Cape Verde
November 24: Universidade de Santiago opened in Assomada
December 13: São Filipe Municipal Museum opened in the old town hall of São Filipe

Sports

Sporting Clube da Praia won the Cape Verdean Football Championship

References

 
Years of the 21st century in Cape Verde
2000s in Cape Verde
Cape Verde
Cape Verde